Johan Joachim Agrell (1 February 170119 January 1765) was a late German/Swedish baroque composer.

He was born in Löth parish, Memming district, Östergötland, a province in Sweden, and studied in Uppsala. By 1734 he was a violinist at the Kassel court, travelling in England, France, Italy, and elsewhere. From 1746 onward, he was Kapellmeister in Nuremberg. He wrote occasional vocal works and numerous symphonies, harpsichord concertos and sonatas, many of which were published. He was a fluent composer in the north German galant style of the time, and is also an appreciated musician and conductor. According to Per Lindfors, it is said that Agrell composed at least 22 symphonies. He died at Nuremberg.

Agrell also used the following variants of his name: Johan Agrelius, Giovanni Agrell, Giovanni Aggrell, Johann Agrell, Johann Joachim Agrell.

References

Bibliography

External links

The Agrell family's homepage

1701 births
1765 deaths
18th-century classical composers
18th-century German people
German Baroque composers
German Classical-period composers
Swedish classical composers
German male classical composers
Swedish Baroque composers
18th-century Swedish musicians
18th-century German composers
18th-century German male musicians